The 2003 Ohio State Buckeyes football team represented Ohio State University in the 2003 NCAA Division I-A football season.  The team's head coach was Jim Tressel.  The Buckeyes played their home games in Ohio Stadium. Ohio State finished the season with an overall record of 11–2 and placed second in the Big Ten Conference with mark of 6–2.  The Buckeyes concluded their season with a victory over Kansas State in the Fiesta Bowl.

Schedule

Roster

Game summaries

Washington

Source: 
    
    
    
    
    
    

The 2003 season opened to excitement and to disappointment.   Reports surfaced during the preseason that led to star RB Maurice Clarett being suspended indefinitely, and he was the center of attention as ESPN’s College Gameday came to Columbus.  A top 20 battle was set to be waged between the #17/19 Washington Huskies and the #2 ranked defending National Champion Ohio State Buckeyes.  Ohio State came in 5–0 in night games in Ohio Stadium; meanwhile Washington was welcoming a new head coach, Keith Gilberston, who was replacing the fired Rick Neuheisel.
    
The Huskies featured such stars as QB "Cowboy" Cody Pickett, 1st round draft pick Reggie Williams, offensive tackle Khaliff Barnes, and TE Joe Toledo  (who would go on to the NFL as an OT).  On the defensive side Greg Carothers and Roc Alexander were the big names, but they would be no match for the powerful Ohio State offense.

Maurice Hall scored at the 8:31 mark in the first Quarter to take a 7–0 lead.  They built on that lead with a magnificent 28-yard scramble by Craig Krenzel with 2:51 left in the 1st.  Ohio state would take a 21–0 lead into halftime, when Craig Krenzel again scrambled 11 yards for a score with 22 seconds remaining.

Washington came out with some renewed vigor to start the 3rd, but only came away with a field goal by Evan Knudson, making it 21–3, with 13:22 left to go in the 3rd.  Ohio State wouldn’t slow down however, and junior tailback Lydell Ross scored off a bruising 15-yard run to make it 28–3.  Cody Pickett closed out the scoring by rolling out for a 2-yard run, but failing on the 2 point try.  The final score was 28–9, and Ohio State was 1–0, and on a fifteen-game winning streak.

San Diego State
Week 2 brought the Aztecs to Columbus.  The two teams had met in head coach Jim Tressel's first season at Ohio State in 2001, a 27–12 victory.  This time however, San Diego State's QB Matt Dlugolecki was determined to change the outcome, and got the Aztecs rolling with an 11-yard touchdown pass to start the attack.  The #2 ranked Buckeyes managed to add a field goal to make it 7–3 at the 9:54 mark.  The Aztecs were again marching until OSU cornerback Chris Gamble tipped a pass to safety Will Allen, who went 100 yards coast-to-coast in doing so, set the Ohio Stadium record for an interception return, and gave OSU a 10–7 lead.  Another Mike Nugent field goal made it 13–7, it would stay that way on to half time.

Once again, Ohio State's opponent came out with new life after half time, and the Aztecs added a field goal early in the 3rd to make it 13–10 Buckeyes.  But on a day when the OSU offense couldn't do much of anything, not even registering an offensive touchdown, they were able to tack on another Mike Nugent field goal in the 4th, to take a 16–10 advantage.  San Diego State kept up the good fight, making it 16–13, but on the wheels of junior RB Maurice Hall (19 carries - 91 yards), OSU chewed up the clock, and held on for an ugly, 16th straight win.

NC State

Source: ESPN
    
    
    
    
    
    
    
    
    
    
    
    
    

For the second time in 2003, the 2nd ranked Buckeyes welcomed in a Top 25 team. This time it was the high powered offense of #22/24 ranked North Carolina State.  Questions floating around Columbus during the week had presided over the ineptitude of the Ohio State offense.  Senior QB Craig Krenzel had completed just 5 of 20 pass attempts the week prior, and OSU had only managed 196 yards.

NC State had a loaded team featuring QB Philip Rivers (1st Round NFL Draft Pick), RB T. A. McLendon, WR Jerricho Cotchery (draft pick of the New York Jets), and offensive lineman Sean Locklear (selected by the Seattle Seahawks).  On defense, though young, DE Mario Williams and DT John McCargo would both go on to be 1st round draft picks, with Williams going #1 overall.  This Ohio State squad was loaded with future NFL stars however, and they were ready to prove they were up to task.

NC State started off struggling for every yard, and Ohio State drew first blood.  Michael Jenkins got off to a great start, with a 44-yard touchdown reception off of a shallow drag (he ended up with 7 catches for 124 yards and 2 touchdowns) at the 4:13 mark of the first quarter.  On the ensuing kickoff, the NC State returners collided with each other, and the ball bounced off a helmet of the returner.  Will Allen (ho would go on to earn All American status after the season) recovered the ball on the 4-yard line, and Lydell Ross punched it in three plays later from two yards out, making it 14–0 with 2:47 left in the first quarter.  Though the first quarter, NC State had managed just five yards off 15 plays.  N.C. State finally got their offense untracked thanks to some tough running from the injured McLendon, who was questionable at the start of the game.  The drive ended when Jericho Cotchery was wide open on an 11-yard scoring strike from Rivers just before halftime.  OSU’s lead shrunk to 14–7.

NC State just couldn’t quite get keep it together, much of the reasoning was thanks to Will Smith and the Buckeye’s defense constantly harassing Rivers.  A Wolfpack turnover led to a 22-yard field goal for OSU in the third quarter.  Ohio State appeared to be in complete control after Craig Krenzel scrambled 6 yards for OSU's third touchdown of the day.  With 11:26 left, the Wolfpack's time seemed to be running out.  “The Chest” Chuck Amato (NC State HC) had other ideas however, as NC St. scored on their next 3 possessions.  The first came on a 9-yard touchdown pass from Rivers to Cotchery.  Then after A. J. Davis picked off a Krenzel pass, NC St. added a FG to cut it to 24-17 with 5:51 left.  The Wolfpack would get the ball back and would complete the comeback with a game-tying 5-yard touchdown pass from Rivers to T.J. Williams with just 21 seconds left to force OT.

It was the first overtime game in Ohio Stadium, and would set the bar impossibly high for any future overtime contests.  Ohio State had first possession, and Krenzel hit sr. tight-end Ben Hartsock for a 10-yard score.  Rivers would match the Buckeyes though, with his own 17-yard touchdown pass.  The Wolfpack would start off on offense for the next series, and T. A. McLendon took a toss 2 yards to the end-zone to take a 38–31 lead.  Now OSU's turn, freshman tight-end Ryan Hamby's first receiving touchdown in his career brought the Buckeyes even at 38-all.  Staying with Ohio State, “Mr. Clutch” Michael Jenkins caught a 7-yard touchdown that was a bullet Krenzel squeezed between 2 N.C. State defenders to give OSU a 44–38 lead.  The  mandatory two-point conversion try was a swatted down pass, so now N.C. State would have a chance to seal the win.  The Wolfpack would march up to the 4-yard line, where some curious play calling began.
  
On first down from the four, Rivers took it up the middle on a QB sneak, and was stuffed for no gain.  A second down pass was broken up by jr. cornerback Chris Gamble, who just barely missed a game clinching pick.  In a peculiar move, Rivers again went for a QB sneak from the same formation as their first down play, only to be stuffed again.  It was 4th and game from the 4-yard line.  NC State ran the same toss McLendon scored on the previous possession, but a bruising shoulder tackle to the spinning running back placed the McClendon firmly on his butt, inches from the goal line.  It was as close as you could get, with the referees taking several tense moments to decide whether or not he got in, but once again, Will Allen, as he would do so many times during his Buckeye career, preserved Ohio State’s 17th victory, in what is the longest game in Ohio State history.  It took 4 hours and 17 minutes, but after 3 overtime periods, Ohio State 44, North Carolina State 38.

Bowling Green
A week 4 showdown was set between the #4 ranked Ohio State Buckeyes and the Bowling Green Falcons.  Bowling Green had been built up quite a bit by former head coach Urban Meyer, and new head coach Gregg Brandon was looking to keep the team on track.  With stars such as QB Josh Harris and center Scott Mruczkowski (both of whom would spend time in the NFL); the Falcons were primed to pick apart the Buckeyes.  The game also featured two of the Nation’s best kickers in Shaun Suisham (BGSU) and Jr. Mike Nugent (OSU).

Starting QB Craig Krenzel would miss the contest from an elbow injury he suffered against N.C. State, and Sr. Quarterback Scott McMullen of Granville, OH would lead the team for the first time since 2001 (he played mop up duty for the Bucks in 2002).  
It would be the Buckeyes striking first as  Scott McMullen sent a 7-yard strike to Sr. Drew Carter, and the Buckeyes had a 7–0 lead.  Josh Harris matched McMullen’s touchdown with a 7-yard toss as well.  Unfortunately for the Falcons, that would be their only score of the first half.

OSU built up a 17–7 halftime advantage with a 47-yard field goal by Mike Nugent, and added a touchdown after a crushing 33-yard run by Lydell Ross on 4th and 1.  Ross and fellow running back Maurice Hall would combine for 201-yards on the day (Hall - 107 yards on 19 carries; Ross - 94 on 22).

Ross scored on a 3-yard run in the 4th, to give the Buckeyes a 24–7 lead, just as they had possessed the week before.  And just as the week before, Bowling Green mounted a furious 4th quarter comeback, scoring a touchdown with 3:25 left to go, and a recovering the onsides kick.  A field goal at the end of that drive had OSU fans on the edge of their seats.  OSU recovered BG's second onsides kick attempt, but failed to run out the clock.  It wouldn’t be until who-else-but safety Will Allen intercepted Harris's final pass that the fans could relax.  Ohio State had scored their 4th win of the season, and 18th straight.

Northwestern

Wisconsin
October 11, 2003

Iowa

Indiana

Penn State

Michigan State

Purdue

Michigan

100th meeting

Fiesta Bowl

Source:

Rankings

Coaching staff
 Jim Tressel - Head Coach - 3rd year
 Jim Bollman - Offensive Line / Offensive Coordinator (3rd year)
 Bill Conley - Tight Ends / Recruiting Coordinator (17th year)
 Joe Daniels - Quarterbacks (3rd year)
 Mark Dantonio - Defensive Coordinator (3rd year)
 Luke Fickell - Special Teams (3rd year)
 Jim Heacock - Defensive Line (8th year)
 Mark Snyder - Defensive Linebackers (3rd year)
 Tim Spencer - Running Backs (10th year)
 Mel Tucker - Defensive Backs (3rd year)
 Bob Tucker - Director of Football Operations (9th year)
 Dick Tressel - Associate Director of Football Operations (3rd year)

Depth chart

Source: Athletic Department official site, 2002 football archive 12-10-02 depth chart

2004 NFL draftees

References

Ohio State
Ohio State Buckeyes football seasons
Fiesta Bowl champion seasons
Ohio State Buckeyes football